The International Phonetic Alphabet, or IPA, is an alphabetic system of phonetic notation based primarily on the Latin alphabet. It was devised by the International Phonetic Association as a standardized representation of the sounds of spoken language.

In the IPA, non-pulmonic consonants are sounds whose airflow is not dependent on the lungs. These include clicks (found in the Khoisan languages and some neighboring Bantu languages of Africa), implosives (found in languages such as Sindhi, Hausa, Swahili and Vietnamese), and ejectives (found in many Amerindian and Caucasian languages). Ejectives occur in about 20% of the world's languages, implosives in roughly 13%, and clicks in very few.

In the audio samples below, the consonants are pronounced with the vowel [a] for demonstration.

See also 

 IPA vowel chart with audio 
 IPA pulmonic consonant chart with audio

References 

International Phonetic Alphabet